The New Zealand national cricket team toured Australia in the 1987-88 season and played 3 Test matches against Australia.  Australia won the series 1-0 with two matches drawn.

Test series summary

First Test

Second Test

Third Test

External sources
CricketArchive

References
 Playfair Cricket Annual
 Wisden Cricketers Almanack 

1987 in Australian cricket
1987 in New Zealand cricket
1987–88 Australian cricket season
1988 in Australian cricket
1988 in New Zealand cricket
International cricket competitions from 1985–86 to 1988
1987-88